Hersh is a given name and surname. People with the name include:

Given name
 Hersh Leib Sigheter
 Hersh Wolch

Surname
 Arek Hersh, concentration camp survivor and writer (born 1928)
 Kristin Hersh, American singer-songwriter (born 1966)
 Mayer Hersh, Polish concentration camp survivor (1926–2016)
 Patricia Hersh, American mathematician (born 1973)
 Reuben Hersh, American mathematician (1927–2020)
 Seymour "Sy" Hersh, American journalist (born 1937)

See also
 Herschel (disambiguation)
 Hersch
 Hirsh
 Hirsch (disambiguation)

Jewish surnames
Jewish given names
German given names
German-language surnames
Yiddish-language surnames